Thurl Lee Bailey (born April 7, 1961) is an American former professional basketball player whose National Basketball Association (NBA) career spanned from 1983 to 1999 with the Utah Jazz and the Minnesota Timberwolves.  Bailey has been a broadcast analyst for the Utah Jazz and the University of Utah— in addition to work as an inspirational speaker, singer, songwriter, and film actor. Bailey garnered the nickname "Big T" during his basketball career.

Basketball career 

Bailey attended North Carolina State University and was a leader in the Wolfpack's miracle run to the 1983 NCAA Championship. That year, under head coach Jim Valvano, he led the Wolfpack in both scoring and rebounding. The Utah Jazz selected him as the 7th pick of the 1983 NBA draft.  Jazz management reported that he was selected for the quality of his character, as well as the quality of his game. This was the beginning of 16 years of playing professional basketball, with 12 of those years in the NBA. Bailey’s career-high points game came on March 14, 1988, when he scored 41 points and grabbed 8 rebounds in a 116-115 win over the Denver Nuggets.

Bailey was a starter with the Jazz for most of his first two seasons, but with the drafting of Karl Malone, Jazz coach Frank Layden made Bailey one of the first options off the bench.  As a result, Bailey had his two finest NBA seasons in 1987–88 (19.6 ppg, played in all 82 games and started 10 times) and 1988–89 (19.5 ppg, 82 games, 3 starts). Both seasons saw him finish second in Sixth Man of the Year voting. During Bailey’s Utah tenure, he played in 665 games, missing only 4 games he was eligible to play in. 

On November 25, 1991, he was traded by the Jazz along with a 1992 second-round draft pick to the Minnesota Timberwolves for Tyrone Corbin. Bailey holds the unusual distinction of playing 84 combined regular-season games during the 1991–92 season for both teams.  He played for almost three seasons in Minnesota until 1994 when he left the NBA and played in the Greek League (playing for Panionios) for the 1994–95 season. From 1995 to 1998 he played in the Italian League for Polti Cantù in 1995–97 and Stefanel Milano in 1997–98, before returning to the Jazz as a free agent on January 21, 1999. He retired after the end of the 1998–99 season.

Community service

Throughout his career, Bailey has also been involved in community service. He has directed basketball camps for youth since 1984 in which he teaches young people lessons about life and basketball. Bailey's basketball camps often focus on students with serious illnesses or disadvantaged backgrounds. Bailey's record of service has resulted in numerous awards for leadership and contributions to the community. Included in his awards are: the NBA's prestigious Kennedy Community Award, the Utah Association for Gifted Children's Community Service Award, Sigma Gamma Chi fraternity's Exemplary Manhood Award, the Great Salt Lake Council of the Boy Scouts of America's American Champion Award and the Italian League's 1998 All-Star Games Most Valuable Player.

Career after the NBA
Bailey is a public speaker, a broadcast analyst for the Utah Jazz and the University of Utah, an actor, and a singer/songwriter. Bailey's albums include Faith In Your Heart (1998), The Gift of Christmas (2001), and I'm Not the Same (2002).

Bailey is chairman of Big T Productions, Fertile Earth (which has a patent pending on a fertilizer that works through irrigation sprinkler systems), and FourLeaf Films.

He works with various charities, including Make-A-Wish, D.A.R.E., and the Happy Factory.

Coaching career
Bailey continues to coach in the Salt Lake City area using the private coaching service, CoachUp.

Politics
Bailey gave the opening prayer at the 2008 Republican National Convention.

Personal life
Bailey was born in Washington, D.C., and grew up in a high-crime neighborhood of Capitol Heights, Maryland bordering D.C.

Bailey is the father of six children. He has a daughter, Chonell, with his high school sweetheart and two sons, Thurl, Jr., and TeVaun from his first marriage.  Bailey and his wife, Sindi (née Southwick), live in Highland, Utah with their three children BreElle, Brendan, and Bryson. His son Brendan played basketball at Marquette.

Religion
Bailey was raised Baptist. While playing basketball in Italy, Bailey decided to join the Church of Jesus Christ of Latter-day Saints. He was baptized by his father-in-law on December 31, 1995.

Filmography

References

External links

 
 
 Historical Player Profile at NBA.com
 
 Thurl Bailey Talks about His Life Purpose, video on YouTube
 Thurl Bailey — Former NBA player — Discussion 59 interview on the Mormon Channel

1961 births
Living people
African-American basketball players
African-American Latter Day Saints
American expatriate basketball people in Greece
American expatriate basketball people in Italy
American male film actors
American men's basketball players
Basketball players from Washington, D.C.
Converts to Mormonism from Baptist denominations
Latter Day Saints from North Carolina
Latter Day Saints from Utah
Lega Basket Serie A players
Minnesota Timberwolves players
NC State Wolfpack men's basketball players
Olimpia Milano players
Pallacanestro Cantù players
Panionios B.C. players
Power forwards (basketball)
Utah Jazz draft picks
Utah Jazz players